Patrick Ilongo Ngasanya nicknamed Saddam (born 8 August 1984) is a Congolese football midfielder who plays for Power Dynamos, having previously played for Forest Rangers.

He was a member of the Congolese 2006 African Nations Cup team, who progressed to the quarter finals, where they were eliminated by Egypt, who eventually won the tournament.

References

External links
 
 
 
 

1984 births
Living people
Footballers from Kinshasa
Democratic Republic of the Congo footballers
Democratic Republic of the Congo expatriate footballers
Democratic Republic of the Congo international footballers
2006 Africa Cup of Nations players
Hapoel Tel Aviv F.C. players
Czech First League players
FK Mladá Boleslav players
PFC Spartak Nalchik players
FC Lokomotiv Moscow players
Association football forwards
Daring Club Motema Pembe players
Russian Premier League players
Forest Rangers F.C. players
Democratic Republic of the Congo expatriate sportspeople in Israel
Democratic Republic of the Congo expatriate sportspeople in the Czech Republic
Democratic Republic of the Congo expatriate sportspeople in Russia
Expatriate footballers in Israel
Expatriate footballers in the Czech Republic
Expatriate footballers in Russia
21st-century Democratic Republic of the Congo people